The Carrollton Viaduct, located over the Gwynns Falls stream near Carroll Park in southwest Baltimore, Maryland, is the first stone masonry bridge for railroad use in the United States, built for the Baltimore and Ohio Railroad, founded 1827, and one of the world's oldest railroad bridges still in use for rail traffic. Construction began in 1828 and was completed in 1829. The bridge is named in honor of Charles Carroll of Carrollton (1737–1832), of Maryland, known for being the last surviving signer of the Declaration of Independence, the only Roman Catholic in the Second Continental Congress (1775–1781), and wealthiest man in the Thirteen Colonies of the time of the American Revolutionary War (1775–1783).

In 1982 the viaduct was designated a National Historic Civil Engineering Landmark by the American Society of Civil Engineers.

Description

The bridge is currently one of the world's oldest railroad bridges still in use for rail traffic, carrying loads far greater than originally envisioned. It was named after Charles Carroll of Carrollton (1737–1832), the last living signer of the Declaration of Independence and a director of the Baltimore and Ohio Railroad, who laid the cornerstone on July 4, 1828. As he laid the first stone he said, "I consider this among the most important acts of my life, second only to my signing the Declaration of Independence." Builder Caspar Wever and designer James Lloyd completed the structure for the railroad in November 1829, at an officially listed cost of $58,106.73. The actual cost of the construction may have been as high as $100,000.

To provide an underpass for a wagon road, an arched passageway,  in width, was built through one of the masonry-walled approaches. Originally planned as one arch of  chord, the dimensions were enlarged to quiet the concern of the proprietor of the mills located immediately above the bridge site, who feared that 40 feet would be insufficient if the stream was flooded. The heavy granite blocks which form the arches and exterior walls were procured from Ellicott's Mills and Port Deposit. A temporary wooden framework supporting the central span held 1,500 tons (1,360 tonnes) of this stone during construction. A white cornerstone at one end of the bridge bears the inscription "James Lloyd of Maryland, Builder A.D. 1829."

Andrew Jackson, the first President of the United States to ride on a railroad train, crossed the bridge on a trip between Ellicott's Mills and Baltimore on June 6, 1833. The Carrollton Viaduct has provided continual service to the Baltimore and Ohio Railroad and its modern corporate successor, CSX Transportation.

The viaduct was designated a National Historic Landmark on November 11, 1971 and was automatically listed on the National Register of Historic Places the same day.

In 1982 the viaduct was designated a National Historic Civil Engineering Landmark by the American Society of Civil Engineers.

See also

Baltimore Terminal Subdivision
List of bridges documented by the Historic American Engineering Record in Maryland
List of bridges on the National Register of Historic Places in Maryland
List of National Historic Landmarks in Maryland
National Register of Historic Places listings in South and Southeast Baltimore
Skerne Bridge (World's oldest railroad bridge still in use for rail traffic)

References
Notes

Works cited

 "Significance" section.

External links

American Society of Civil Engineers - Carrollton Viaduct

, including photo, at Maryland Historical Trust

Baltimore and Ohio Railroad bridges
Bridges in Baltimore County, Maryland
Bridges completed in 1829
Crossings of the Patapsco River
Transportation buildings and structures in Baltimore
CSX Transportation bridges
Historic American Engineering Record in Baltimore
Historic Civil Engineering Landmarks
National Historic Landmarks in Maryland
Railroad bridges in Maryland
Railroad bridges on the National Register of Historic Places in Maryland
Viaducts in the United States
Railroad-related National Historic Landmarks
National Register of Historic Places in Baltimore County, Maryland
Stone arch bridges in the United States